The Six Pack was a radio talk show and podcast that aired on Sirius XM Radio from 2009 to 2012. The show was hosted by Dave Rubin and Ben Harvey. Beginning in May 2009, The Six Pack went on to become the leading LGBT podcast on iTunes. 

The show's segments included celebrity interviews, news, pop culture, and music. The duo was referred to as the "gay Lewis and Clark of the airwaves" by Modern Tonic, and their on-air rapport had been labeled a "mas macho" version of Ryan Seacrest and Simon Cowell from American Idol by Entertainment Weekly. 

The Six Pack was both recorded and broadcast live at Sirius XM Radio in New York City.

After wrapping up a year on Sirius XM Radio, Dave Rubin went on to host his own talk show, The Rubin Report, on The Young Turks Network in Los Angeles, California.

Episodes

References

External links 
 

LGBT-related radio programs
American comedy radio programs
American talk radio programs
2009 radio programme debuts
2012 radio programme endings
LGBT-related podcasts
Comedy and humor podcasts
2000s LGBT-related mass media
2010s LGBT-related mass media
2009 podcast debuts
2012 podcast endings
Talk show podcasts